Aulopiformes  is a diverse order of marine ray-finned fish consisting of some 15 extant and several prehistoric families with about 45 genera and over 230 species. The common names grinners, lizardfishes and allies, or aulopiforms are sometimes used for this group. The scientific name means "Aulopus-shaped", from Aulopus (the type genus) + the standard fish order suffix "-formes". It ultimately derives from Ancient Greek aulós (αὐλός, "flute" or "pipe") + Latin forma ("external form"), the former in reference to the elongated shape of many aulopiforms.

They are grouped together because of common features in the structure of their gill arches. Indeed, many authors have considered them so distinct as to warrant separation in a monotypic superorder of the Teleostei, under the name Cyclosquamata. However, monotypic taxa are generally avoided by modern taxonomists if not necessary, and in this case a distinct superorder seems indeed unwarranted: together with the equally dubious superorder "Stenopterygii", the grinners appear to be so closely related to some Protacanthopterygii to be included in that superorder. In particular, this group might be the sister taxon of the Salmoniformes (salmon, trout, and relatives). As an alternative, the superorders are sometimes united as an unranked clade named Euteleostei, but in that case the Protacanthopterygii would need to be split further to account for the phylogenetic uncertainty. This would result in a highly cumbersome and taxonomically redundant group of two very small and no less than four monotypic superorders.

Description
Many aulopiforms are deep-sea fishes, with some species recognized as being hermaphrodites, some with the ability to self-fertilise. Some are benthic, but most are pelagic nekton. In general, aulopiform fish have a mixture of advanced and primitive characteristics relative to other teleost fish.

Aulopiforms have either a vestigial gas bladder, or lack it entirely, a hypaxialis muscle that is unusually extended to forward at its upper end and attaches to the neurocranium below the spine (perhaps to snap the upper part of the skull down when catching prey) and the position of the maxillary bone. Their second pharyngobranchial is greatly elongated posterolaterally away from third pharyngobranchial, which lacks a cartilaginous condyle to articulate with the preceding, but is contacted by the elongated uncinate process of the second epibranchial. Other features include the position of the pelvic fins far back on the body, the fused medial processes of pelvic girdle, and the presence of an adipose fin (which is also typical for the Protacanthopterygii).

The larvae of some Aulopiformes are extremely bizarre-looking, with elongated fins, and do not resemble the adult animals. They were not only described as distinct species, but also even separated as genera and finally in a family "Macristiidae" which was allied with various Protacanthopterygii (sensu lato), but the initial assessment – which found "Macristium" to resemble the deepwater lizardfishes (Bathysauridae) in some details – was not far off the mark: "Macristium" species are larvae of Bathysaurus, while the supposed other "macristiids",   "Macristiella" species are larvae of the deepsea tripodfish Bathytyphlops.

Classification

 Suborder Alepisauroidei
 Family Alepisauridae – lancetfishes
 Family Anotopteridae – daggertooths (may belong in Paralepididae)
 Family Evermannellidae – sabertooth fishes
 Family Omosudidae – hammerjaw (sometimes included in Alepisauridae)
 Family Paralepididae – barracudinas
 Family †Polymerichthyidae – an extinct alepisauroid closely related to the daggertooths and lancetfish
 Family Scopelarchidae – pearleyes
 Suborder Chlorophthalmoidei
 Family Bathysauroididae – pale deepsea lizardfish
 Family Bathysauropsidae – lizard greeneyes (sometimes included in Ipnopidae)
 Family Chlorophthalmidae – greeneyes
 Family Ipnopidae – deepsea tripodfishes
 Family Notosudidae – waryfishes
 Suborder Enchodontoidei (including Halecoidei, Ichthyotringoidei, may belong in Alepisauroidei; fossil)
 Genus Nardorex (fossil, tentatively placed here)
 Genus Serrilepis (fossil, tentatively placed here)
 Genus Yabrudichthys (fossil, tentatively placed here)
 Family Apateopholidae (fossil)
 Family Cimolichthyidae (fossil)
 Family Dercetidae (fossil)
 Family Enchodontidae (fossil)
 Family Eurypholidae (fossil)
 Family Halecidae (fossil)
 Family Ichthyotringidae (fossil)
 Family Prionolepididae (fossil)
 Suborder Giganturoidei
 Family Bathysauridae – deepwater lizardfishes
 Family Giganturidae – telescopefishes
 Suborder Synodontoidei
 Family Aulopidae – flagfins
 Family Paraulopidae – "cucumberfishes"
 Family Pseudotrichonotidae – sandliving lizardfishes, sand-diving lizardfishes
 Family Synodontidae – typical lizardfishes

Timeline of genera

Footnotes

References

 

 
 

 
Articles which contain graphical timelines
Ray-finned fish orders